Todber is a village and civil parish in the county of Dorset in southern England. The underlying geology is Corallian limestone. In the 2011 census the parish had 55 households and a population of 140.

In 1086 Todber was recorded in the Domesday Book as Todeberie; it was in the hundred of Gillingham, the lord was Geoffrey Mallory and the tenant-in-chief was William of Mohun. It had one mill,  of meadow and 2 ploughlands.

Todber parish church was rebuilt in the Early English and Perpendicular styles in 1879, though the tower is of earlier construction.

Todber is one of four parishes — the others being East Stour, Stour Provost and West Stour — under the governance of The Stours Parish Council.

References

Villages in Dorset